Şahan Arzruni   (born 8 June 1943) is an Armenian classical pianist,  ethnomusicologist, lecturer, composer, writer and producer, residing in New York City.

Early life and education
Arzruni (also transliterated as Artsruni), whose family name belongs to an ancient Armenian nobility, was born in Istanbul, Turkey. His father is Stepan Jirayr Arzruni, and mother Maryam Kalpak. Composer Sirvart Kalpakyan Karamanuk is his maternal aunt who encouraged Arzruni to play the piano at the age of four; he appeared publicly at the age of five. He received his general education at Esayan and Getronagan Armenian Lyceums, and graduated from the Istanbul Municipal Conservatory (now Istanbul University State Conservatory), where he studied piano with Ferdi Statzer and harmony with Raşit Abed.

He moved to New York in 1964 to study further at the Juilliard School of Music on a scholarship from the Calouste Gulbenkian Foundation. There his principal teachers were Sascha Gorodnitzki in piano, Felix Galimir in chamber music, Joseph Bloch in piano literature, and Hall Overton in composition. Arzruni graduated from Juilliard, earning his Bachelor of Science degree in 1967 and a Master of Science degree in 1968. Arzruni has also pursued doctoral studies at New York University.

Career
Motivated by ethnic awareness in the United States, Arzruni continuously investigates the musical roots of his Armenian heritage. He researches traditional Armenian music and has recorded a three-disc anthology of Armenian piano music, as well as co-produced an eight-disc set of instrumental and vocal Armenian music. He also delivered papers and organized symposia for such institutions as Harvard University, Columbia University and University of Michigan at Ann Arbor. Şahan Arzruni is the author of books and a contributor of articles for academic journals; he has also written for various editions of The New Grove Dictionary and the Dictionary of the Middle Ages.

A Steinway artist, he was invited to perform on an 1869 Steinway piano at the Metropolitan Museum of Art for the inaugural of the centennial celebrations of the Museum’s collection of historic instruments.  In 2001, Mr. Arzruni delivered a lecture on Armenian liturgical chants at the invitation of the U.S. Library of Congress, in Washington, D.C.

Şahan Arzruni has performed with Victor Borge, playing the role of straight man in Borge's concerts starting with the late 1960s, and appeared with Borge at the 1980 Royal Variety Show Command Performance where the pair performed Borge's classic comedic arrangement for duet piano of Liszt's Second Hungarian Rhapsody.

Arzruni appeared in television and radio broadcasts, including The Tonight Show Starring Johnny Carson, The Mike Douglas Show and a number of PBS specials and has recorded for European radio networks, including the BBC. Arzruni has given command performances at the White House, as well as the British, Danish, Swedish, and Icelandic courts. In 2008, he was awarded "Honorary Professorship" from Yerevan Komitas State Conservatory in Armenia. In 2015, Şahan Arzruni was awarded the Presidential Movses Khorenatsi medal, the Republic of Armenia's highest cultural award.

In 2017, 2019, and again in 2022, Arzruni visited various provinces of Armenia, as well as the Republic of Artsakh, coaching young musicians and performing in recitals. While on the road, he stopped over in ancient, remote monasteries, exploring and photographing the sites. This documentation is presently serving as the basis of a series of articles in Paros monthly, published in Istanbul.

During the Covid-19 pandemic, Şahan Arzruni curated a series of mini-concerts online, "Together for Armenia," to help Armenia financially.

Arzruni records for New World Records, Composers Recordings, Musical Heritage Society, Hearts of Space, Philips, Varèse Sarabande, Good Music, Positively Armenian, and Kalan Müzik.

Awards, Grants and Honors
 Armenian General Benevolent Union Recording Grant, 2020
 Calouste Gulbenkian Foundation Recording Grant, 2019
 Knights of Vartan Award, 2018
 Movses Khorenatsi medal, 2015
 Bedros and Leda Şirinoğlu Recording Grant, 2013
 Dikran and Nadya Gülmezgil Recording Grant, 2010
 Honorary Professorship, Yerevan Komitas State Conservatory, 2008
 Harutyun Amira Bezdjian medal, Surp Pırgiç Armenian Hospital, 2008
 Knight of Armenian Art, 2005
 Boyan Award, 2004
 Composers Fund: The New York Community Trust, 2001
 Asian Cultural Council Residency Program Grant, 1999
 Louise M. Simone Travel Grant, 1998, 1997, 1995, 1994
 Order of St. Sahak and St. Mesrop, 1996
 Dolores Zohrab Liebmann Fund Publication Grant, 1996
 Steinway Artist, 1994
 Renaissance Medal, 1993
 Alex Manoogian Travel Grant, 1990, 1986, 1981, 1979.
 Juilliard Scholarship, 1968, 1967, 1966, 1965, 1964.
 Armenian General Benevolent Union Outright Grant, 1966, 1965.
 Calouste Gulbenkian Foundation Scholarship, 1965, 1964

Discography

Performer
Alan Hovhaness: Selected Piano Compositions (2019, Kalan) 
Hommage: Piano Works by Early Armenian Composers (2014, Kalan) 
Komitas: Complete Works for Piano (2011, Kalan)
Edvard Mirzoyan: Poem, Album For My Granddaughter (2004, Charents Museum of Literature and Arts, Yerevan, Armenia)
Childhood Memories (2001, New World Records)
Midnight Chopin (1995, Good Music)
Alan Hovhaness: Visionary Landscapes (1991, Hearts of Space) 
Louise Talma: Three Bagatelles, Kaleidoscopic Variations (1987, CRI)
An Anthology of Armenian Piano Music / 3 LPs (1979, Musical Heritage Society) 
Jerome Moross: Sonata for Piano Duet and Strings (1979, Varèse Sarabande Records)
Joseph Haydn: Complete Sonatas with violin (1977, Musical Heritage Society)
Toccatas (1974, Musical Heritage Society)
Béla Bartók: For Children (1974, Musical Heritage Society)
Dmitri Kabalevsky: Children’s Pieces (1973, Musical Heritage Society)
Aram Khachaturian: Children’s Album I & II (1972, Musical Heritage Society)

Producer
Armenian Composers in Asia Minor (2008, Kalan)
Sirvart Kalpakyan Karamanuk: Memories of Love / 2 CDs (2005, Charents Museum of Literature and Arts)
Sirvart Kalpakyan Karamanuk: Children’s Songs (2003, Charents Museum of Literature and Arts) 
Sirvart Kalpakyan Karamanuk: Choral Music (2001, Albany Records)
Makar Yekmalian: Divine Liturgy (2002, Diocese of Armenian Church of America [Eastern])
Nikol Galanderian: Children’s Songs (2001, Fund for Armenian Relief)
Koharik Gazarossian: A Memorial Album (1997, private)
A Survey of Armenian Music / 8 LPs – Co-producer (1987, Positively Armenian)
Komitas: A Centenary Album / 2 LPs – Artistic Director (1970, Komitas Centennial Committee)

Writings
 Քրիստափոր Կարա-Մուրզայի կեանքը կը վերածուի լաւ պատմուած զրոյցի [The life of Kristapor Kara-Murza evolves into an effective story]. Istanbul: Jamanak, 2014-06-14, p 3 (Armenian).

References

External links
Sahan Arzruni - Armeniapedia entry
Sahan Arzruni at the BBC comedy guide
Şahan Arzruni website

1943 births
Living people
Armenian classical pianists
American people of Armenian descent
New York University alumni
Juilliard School alumni
Musicians from Istanbul
Turkish people of Armenian descent
Turkish emigrants to the United States
21st-century classical pianists